Sher Singh (4 December 1807 – 15 September 1843) was the fourth Maharaja of the Sikh Empire.  Elder of the twins of Maharaja Ranjit Singh, founder of the Sikh Empire and Maharani Mehtab Kaur. His reign began on 18 January 1840 following his assault on Lahore which ended the brief regency of Maharani Chand Kaur. He was assassinated on 15 September 1843 by Ajit Singh Sandhawalia.

Birth
Sher Singh was the son of Maharaja Ranjit Singh and Maharani Mehtab Kaur, he had a younger twin brother Tara Singh (1807-1859).

Early life
In 1820, Maharaja Ranjit Singh granted him the privilege of being seated in the Darbar and bestowed civil and military honors on him. From 1831 to 1834 he acted as Governor of Kashmir and in 1834 he was a commander in the force that captured Peshawar from the Afghans.

Military campaigns
Barelvi declared jihad against the Sikhs and established a camp in Balakot. Along with Shah Ismail Dehlvi and his tribesmen,In 1831, Sher Singh accompanied by Pratab Singh Attarwala and Akali Hanuman Singh arrived Balakot, He invested Balakot on all sides, The Sikh slowly advanced narrowing the besieged area gradually, On reaching near the sayyid residence, the sikh drew out their swords, cut down the sayyid troops like grass and shot down Sayyid Ahmed Khan, His head cut off for display, and about 500 followers of Sayyid were killed including Shah Ismail Dehlvi, The entire property of Sayyid fell into the hands of Sikhs, A sum of Rs, 50,000 along with a letter of  appreciation was sent to Sher Singh promising an additional Jagir,

Reign

Sher Singh became the maharaja on 27 January 1841,  after the sudden death of Nau Nihal Singh whose death was set in motion, some say purposely while returning from his father's cremation. He was the half-brother of Nau Nihal Singh's father, former maharaja Kharak Singh.

Proclaimed Maharaja by his wazir (prime minister) Dhian Singh Dogra, he won the throne after a protracted siege of the Lahore Fort which was held by the Royal family. Thousands died in the siege.

Death 

Sher Singh was killed as he reached for a new shotgun held by Ajit Singh Sandhawalia, who pulled the trigger. Ajit Singh Sandhawalia had served as Prime Minister first for Ranjit Singh then for Sher Singh's brother Kharak Singh then Karak Singh's son Nau Nihal each of whom had died shortly after taking office. Ajit Singh Sandhawalia then served as Prime Minister for Kharak Singh's widow Chand Kaur who served as regent. Ajit Singh Sandhawalia preferred having Chand Kaur as regent ruler as it allowed him more power. Chand Kaur had been removed as the expected heir her late son Nau Nihal's daughter in law was about to deliver died stillborn. Sher Singh only had time to utter, "what treachery."  The Sandhawalias also murdered Dhian Singh. The Sandhawalias were thought to have also had designs on the empire.

Legacy
His palace is leased to Baring Union Christian College.

Notes

References

External links

 Maharaja Sher Singh (1807 - 1843) 

Sher Singh
1807 births
1843 deaths